The 2023 British Superbike Championship season is the 36th British Superbike Championship season. Bradley Ray is the reigning champion, but he will compete in the Superbike World Championship.

Teams and riders

Race calendar and results

Championship standings

Riders' championship
Scoring system in the Main season
Points are awarded to the top fifteen finishers. A rider has to finish the race to earn points.

Scoring system in the first two rounds in the showdown
Points are awarded to the top fifteen finishers. A rider has to finish the race to earn points.

Scoring system in the season finale
Points are awarded to the top fifteen finishers. A rider has to finish the race to earn points.

References 

British Superbike Championship
British Superbike
British Superbike
Superbike